Gopalarathnam, known by his stage name Typist Gopu, was an Indian actor known for comedy and supporting roles. He acted in over 600 stage plays and 400 films.

Career
A native of Manakkal, Lalgudi in Trichy district, Gopalarathnam was active in college dramas during his B. Com. from Vivekananda College, Chennai and got introduced to the stage through his friend Nagesh in his drama troupe in 1955. In the 1959 play Nenje Nee Vaazhga, he played the role of a typist, which was praised and he got his name "Typist" Gopu. In 1965, he made his film debut in K. Balachandar's movie Naanal and went on to act alongside major actors in the period. He later joined Y. G. Mahendran's United Amateur Artists. He received Kalaimamani in 2002. He also acted on comedy television serials after acting opportunities ceased to come.

Filmography
This is partial filmography. You can expand it.

1960s

1970s

1980s

1990s

2000s

Television 

 Vasool Chakravarthy
 Veetukku Veedu Looty
 Mr. Brain
 Thuppariyum Sambu

References

External links
 
 Typist Gopu on Moviebuff

1930s births
2019 deaths
Male actors in Tamil cinema
Actors in Tamil theatre
Indian male film actors
Recipients of the Kalaimamani Award
People from Tiruchirappalli district
University of Madras alumni
Tamil comedians